Marcelo Daniel Gallardo (born 18 January 1976) is an Argentine football coach and former professional player who last managed River Plate. Gallardo began his career in the club's youth divisions, and made his debut in the Argentine Primera División at age 17 in 1993. After a six-year period in which he won five local league championships, the 1996 Copa Libertadores and the 1997 Supercopa Libertadores, he transferred to France's Ligue 1 AS Monaco FC and was named French League Footballer of the Year in 2000. Gallardo represented Argentina in two FIFA World Cups, although his performance was affected by injuries in both.

During his playing career, Gallardo was an attacking midfielder and playmaker. He was regarded for his vision, technique, class, dribbling, and especially his defence-splitting passing.

After topping the 2010–11 Uruguayan Primera División season with Nacional de Montevideo, Gallardo retired as a player to coach the team. He helped Nacional de Montevideo defend their championship the following season before transferring to River Plate. River Plate won local championships under Gallardo and returned to the international scene, where they had not won a tournament from 1997 to 2014. With the most international tournament championships in team history, he is considered River Plate's most successful coach to date.

Club career

Early years and first seasons with River Plate

Born in Parque San Martín in Merlo Partido in the Greater Buenos Aires area to construction worker Máximo Gallardo and nursing home employee Ana María (née Maidana), Gallardo began playing football at about age 10 in the local Once Colegiales and Nahuel clubs. After receiving offers from several First Division teams to join their junior squads, he landed a trial at River Plate and joined as a midfielder in 1988. Gallardo made his professional debut at age 17 for the club during the 1992–93 Argentinian Torneo de Clausura in a 2–0 win against Newell's Old Boys.

The team then won the 1993–94 Torneo de Apertura. Gallardo won a series of national tournaments with the team during the next few seasons (including the 1994, 1996 and 1997 Torneo de Apertura and the 1997 Torneo de Clausura), and became a starting midfielder by 1996. He received his first international trophy (the Copa Libertadores) that year, as River Plate defeated América de Cali 2–1 in the final series. Starting both matches on the bench, Gallardo took the field in the second half. River Plate lost the Intercontinental Cup 0–1 to Juventus F.C. at Tokyo's National Stadium several months later.

Gallardo was scouted by European teams during the late 1990s and signed with France's Ligue 1 AS Monaco FC, bringing his initial spell with River Plate to an end with the 1998–99 season. He had played 109 league games with the club and scored 17 goals.

AS Monaco
He made his European debut on the opening day of the 1999–2000 season in a 2–2 tie against AS Saint-Étienne, and scored his first goal for the team on 12 September in a 1–2 away loss to Stade Rennais F.C.. Despite an ankle injury before the season, Gallardo quickly adapted to French football and partnered with Ludovic Giuly in midfield and attackers Marco Simone and David Trezeguet. AS Monaco won the Première Division, and Gallardo was selected French League Footballer of the Year with eight goals in 28 matches.

Coach Didier Deschamps benched him midway through the 2000–01 season, and their relationship remained tense until Gallardo left the club at the end of the 2003–04 season with Christian Panucci and Marco Simone. He scored 23 goals in 126 matches in four years with AS Monaco, winning the Coupe de la Ligue during his final season.

Return to River Plate 
Gallardo returned to River Plate in 2004 and was named squad captain. The team won the Torneo de Clausura, his last championship win as a River Plate player, soon after his return. Gallardo played a key scoring role in the 1–1 home tie against Atlético de Rafaela, which clinched the championship over long-standing rivals Boca Juniors.

That year, the team lost to Boca Juniors in the semifinals of the 2004 Copa Libertadores. The series was tied 2–2; Boca Juniors won in the penalty shootout, eliminating River Plate from the tournament. After a physical encounter with Raúl Alfredo Cascini in the first-leg match, both players were given the red card and were unable to participate in the second-leg match. More players were involved in the fight, in which Gallardo scratched Roberto Abbondanzieri's face; it was one of his professional career's darkest moments.

Paris Saint-Germain 
Amid institutional and performance problems in River Plate and a bad streak since his return to the club (including ten red cards in 256 matches), Gallardo began considering offers to return to the French league. Parisian club Paris Saint-Germain F.C. and Olympique de Marseille were interested in him, and he chose the former.

PSG had a poor season, nearly relegated to the second division and eliminated from the UEFA Cup. After one season with the club, scoring two goals in 13 matches, Gallardo terminated his two-year contract to move to Major League Soccer in the United States.

D.C. United
On 29 January 2008, Gallardo was presented as the newest member of D.C. United. With a salary of $1.87 million, Gallardo was the highest-paid player in D.C. United history and its first Designated Player. He had the third-largest salary in MLS that year, behind English midfielder David Beckham of the LA Galaxy ($6.5 million) and Mexican forward Cuauhtémoc Blanco of the Chicago Fire ($2.67 million). Gallardo scored his first league goal for United on 5 April 2008 against Toronto FC. He underwent surgery for a sports hernia on 17 and 19 July, which sidelined him for most of the 2008 season. Scoring four goals in 15 matches, Gallardo's contract was considered one of the worst in MLS history. In February 2009, he left D.C. United and returned to River Plate for the third time.

Nacional de Montevideo

In 2010, after a final short spell in River Plate as a player, Gallardo signed with Nacional de Montevideo in the Uruguayan league. Although he appeared in only 13 matches due to injuries, he was respected for his personality and dedication to the game. On 12 June 2011, Gallardo took the field in the second half for a 1–0 victory against Defensor Sporting for the 2011–12 Uruguayan championship in his final match. He retired as a player and was hired a few days later to manage Nacional, his first managerial position.

International career

Gallardo was considered for the Argentina national under-20 football team, but could not participate in the  1995 FIFA World Youth Championship in Qatar because Argentina national team coach Daniel Passarella wanted to include him on his squad (where he started at age 18 in 1994). He debuted in a 3–0 friendly-match victory against Chile in Santiago that year, substituting for Marcelo Espina.

The midfielder won his first international championship the following year, a gold medal at the 1995 Pan American Games. Considered a key player with Guillermo Barros Schelotto, he scored one of the victory goals in the final penalty shootout against Mexico. Argentina then finished second in the 1995 FIFA Confederations Cup and the 1996 Summer Olympics. Despite losing the Confederations Cup final to Nigeria, Gallardo said in 2018 that he valued that silver medal. He was on the Argentina squad for the 1995 and 1997 Copa América, reaching the quarter-finals both times (considered a failure by the local press).

Although Gallardo had a series of injuries (including a hamstring strain due to a lack of rest between matches) before the 1998 FIFA World Cup in France, he played in the group stage against Jamaica and Croatia and in the eighth-finals victory against England; the team lost in the quarter-finals to Holland. After a near-perfect performance in the CONMEBOL FIFA World Cup qualification, Argentina entered the World Cup in Japan and South Korea as one of the favourites; however, they were eliminated in the group stage for the first time in history. Although Gallardo was part of the squad, he spent the tournament on the bench. Looking back at his injury-plagued World Cup participation, he called not being able to compete at the same level as the other players "the worst thing that can happen to a footballer". During his international career, Gallardo made 44 appearances and scored 13 goals.

Managing career

Nacional

In 2010, before retiring as a player, Gallardo obtained his coaching certificate from José Farías de Vicente López Technical School 62 in Vicente López, Buenos Aires. Days after announcing his retirement from the Nacional de Montevideo squad which won the 2010–11 Uruguayan Primera División season championship, he accepted the team's offer to coach. Nacional defended their championship the next season, becoming the 2011–2012 champions for Gallardo. His assistants included Matías Biscay, Pablo Rodríguez and Marcelo Tulbovitz. Gallardo later described managing Nacional as an "accelerated course", coaching players with whom he had played.

River Plate

2014–2015
On 6 June 2014, Gallardo was presented by technical secretary and former teammate Enzo Francescoli as the new manager of River Plate after the controversial resignation of Ramón Díaz on 27 May. He brought some of his assistants from Nacional de Montevideo, such as Matías Biscay and Marcelo Tulbovitz.  Díaz' key players Carlos Carbonero, Manuel Lanzini and Cristian Ledesma left the club, and players he had relegated (such as Carlos Sánchez and Rodrigo Mora) returned. River Plate bought only two players: attacking midfielder Leonardo Pisculichi, who had been relegated to second division with Argentinos Juniors, and goalkeeper Julio Chiarini from Instituto de Córdoba.

Gallardo's coaching style was praised by the Argentine press, with the team tying its all-time unbeaten record on 9 November with 32 undefeated games before losing to Estudiantes de La Plata three days later. Of the 32 games, eight were played for Ramón Díaz. River Plate led the Torneo de Transición until it reached the Copa Sudamericana semi-finals, where River would face the rival Boca Juniors. Planning to rest his key players for the semi-finals, Gallardo played a substitute team against second-place Racing Club and lost on an own goal by Ramiro Funes Mori. Racing went on to win its first championship since 2001 by two points over River Plate.

River eliminated Boca Juniors with a lone goal from Leonardo Pisculichi in the second leg, played at the Monumental Stadium. In the 2014 Copa Sudamericana Finals, Pisculichi scored again to draw 1–1 against Atlético Nacional in the away leg at the Estadio Atanasio Girardot. Defenders Gabriel Mercado and Germán Pezzella scored in the second leg at the Monumental, giving the unbeaten River Plate a 2–0 win and its first international title since 1997. Gallardo was the first River Plate player to win an international title as a player and a coach. He dedicated the victory to his mother, who had died shortly before the second game against Boca Juniors.

In early 2015, Gallardo's River Plate competed in the 2015 Recopa Sudamericana as the 2014 Copa Sudamericana winners against 2014 Copa Libertadores champions San Lorenzo de Almagro. River won 1–0 at home in the first leg and 1–0 in the second, both goals scored by Carlos Sánchez.

After a poor group stage which nearly eliminated them from the tournament, River Plate advanced to the 2015 Copa Libertadores Round of 16 as the worst team in the group stage to face Boca Juniors (the best team). River won the first leg at home 1–0, with a penalty kick by Carlos Sánchez. In the second leg, played at La Bombonera stadium, the teams had drawn 0–0 at the half. Returning to the pitch for the second half, River Plate's players were attacked by Boca Juniors fans. After a one-hour delay, the match was suspended by a CONMEBOL official. Days later, the organization disqualified Boca Juniors and River advanced to the tournament's quarter-finals. The team later reached the Libertadores final and played against Mexico's Tigres UANL. In the first leg, at the Estadio Universitario, the game was scoreless. In the second leg, played at the Monumental, River won 3–0 with goals by Lucas Alario, Carlos Sánchez, and Ramiro Funes Mori for their first Libertadores championship in nine years. The next day, Gallardo's team travelled to Osaka for the 2015 Suruga Bank Championship against 2014 J.League Cup winners Gamba Osaka. The match was a 3–0 victory for River Plate, the team's fourth international title under Gallardo.

Despite poor results in the 2015 Argentine Primera División, River later advanced to the semi-finals of the 2015 Copa Sudamericana to play against fellow Argentine Club Atlético Huracán. The two-legged series resulted in a 1–0 loss for River in the first leg at home, followed by a 2–2 draw in the second leg. This was Gallardo's first defeat in an international knockout stage as a coach.

River played in the year-end 2015 FIFA Club World Cup, struggling to beat 2015 J1 League winners Sanfrecce Hiroshima 1–0 in the semi-finals with a goal from Lucas Alario and three saves in the first half by goalkeeper Marcelo Barovero. They played poorly in the final, losing 3–0 to European champions FC Barcelona with goals by Lionel Messi and Luis Suárez. Gallardo was named the fifth-best football coach worldwide in 2015 by the IFFHS.

2016–2022

River Plate were eliminated by runners-up Independiente del Valle in the 2016 Copa Libertadores round of 16. River Plate won the 2016 Recopa Sudamericana against 2015 Copa Sudamericana champions Independiente Santa Fe, defeating them 2–1 at home in the second leg after a scoreless first leg for another international title.

In December of that year, Gallardo led River to the 2015–16 Copa Argentina: his first domestic cup as manager. River Plate then earned the right to play in the 2017 Copa Libertadores and the 2016 Supercopa Argentina against 2016 Primera División champion Club Atlético Lanús, where it was defeated 3–0.

River Plate advanced to the semi-finals of the 2017 Copa Libertadores against Club Atlético Lanús. After winning the first leg 1–0 at Monumental Stadium, they lost the second leg at Estadio Ciudad de Lanús 4–2. River Plate lost the semi-finals 4–3 on aggregate. They defeated Atlético Tucumán days later at the 2016–17 Copa Argentina final in Mendoza for their second consecutive Copa Argentina. This gave River Plate the right to play the 2017 Supercopa Argentina against 2016–17 Argentine Primera División champions Boca Juniors, defeating Boca 2–0 on 14 March 2018.

Except for their victory in the Supercopa Argentina, River Plate began 2018 with a losing streak in the Primera División. They played well in the 2018 Copa Libertadores, however, reaching the finals against Boca Juniors. It was the first time two Argentine teams faced each other in a Libertadores final; the last final had a two-legged home-and-away format, although the second match was played at Santiago Bernabéu Stadium because River Plate fans attacked Boca Juniors players at Monumental Stadium. River Plate and Boca Juniors drew the first match 2–2 at La Bombonera, with goals by Lucas Pratto and Carlos Izquierdoz (own goal). The second match, at the Bernabéu, ended in a 1–1 draw; Pratto again scored for River and sent the match into extra time. River won 3–1, with goals by Juan Fernando Quintero and Pity Martínez. Despite missing the finals with a suspension for violating a previous penalty in the semi-finals against Grêmio of Porto Alegre, Gallardo's coaching played a key role in the victory (considered one of the most important in Argentine football history). His coaching was praised by the press, and he was called one of the best River Plate managers of all time.

After winning the 2019 Recopa Sudamericana, Gallardo became the most successful River Plate coach in history with ten titles. He is the most successful coach at the international level in club history to date, with seven international titles: two Copa Libertadores (2015 and 2018), the 2014 Copa Sudamericana, three Recopa Sudamericanas (2015, 2016, and 2019), and the 2015 Suruga Bank Championship. He is considered the greatest coach in River Plate history. Gallardo was named the best 2019 football coach in the Americas by the Uruguayan newspaper El País, and the second-best in the world by the football website Club World Ranking.

Into the early 2020s, Brazilian teams showed a stronger performance than their counterparts in the CONMEBOL international tournaments, due to a higher competitiveness in their local league and a more favorable domestic economic situation. Although Gallardo displayed his ability to form competitive squads over the years in spite of factors such as key players leaving the roster, Argentina's growing economical disparity with Brazil's took its toll in River Plate's performance against its teams. After a tough fall in the 2021 Copa Libertadores quarter-finals against Atlético Mineiro, he acknowledged their rivals beat them, playing "much better", and opted to focus on that year's edition of the Argentine league. The squad eventually went on to win 
the championship and Gallardo equaled Ángel Labruna's record of 22 titles as both a player and a coach for the team. Coming close to the expiration of his contract at the end of the season in the midst of speculations about his continuity, he decided to sign for yet at least one more year., stating that he will not continue on the team and that he will take a short break in his coaching career.

Playing style
Throughout his career, Gallardo played a central or attacking midfield role as a playmaker. A skillful, intelligent player, he was valued for his vision, technique, class, dribbling, and ability to defeat opponents in one-on-one situations and was best known for defence-splitting passes. Gallardo was noted for his accuracy with direct free kicks and his ball delivery from corners and set pieces. His playing style was compared to Diego Maradona in his youth.

Personal life
Gallardo has four sons from his marriage to his high-school sweetheart, Geraldine La Rosa; one is River Plate footballer Nahuel Gallardo. He had little interest in football during his early years, and preferred flying kites. Gallardo said that he was a San Lorenzo de Almagro fan before turning to River Plate, influenced by his mother's family.

During his playing and early coaching years, Gallardo was nicknamed el Muñeco ("the doll"). His teammates started calling him that during the early 1990s, when he was one of the squad's youngest members. Gallardo's successful tenure coaching River Plate earned him the nickname Napoleon from fans and the press.

Career statistics

Club

International

Scores and results list Argentina's goal tally first, score column indicates score after each Gallardo goal.

Managerial statistics

Honours

Player
River Plate
 Argentine Primera División (6): 1993 Apertura, 1994 Apertura, 1996 Apertura, 1997 Apertura, 1997 Clausura, 2004 Clausura
 Copa Libertadores: 1996
 Supercopa Sudamericana: 1997

Monaco
 Ligue 1: 1999–2000
 Coupe de la Ligue: 2002–03
 Trophée des Champions: 2000

Paris Saint-Germain
 Coupe de la Ligue: 2007–08

D.C. United
 U.S. Open Cup: 2008

Nacional
 Uruguayan Primera División: 2010–11

Argentina
 Olympic Silver Medal: 1996
 Pan American Games: 1995 Mar del Plata

Individual
French Division 1 Player of the year: 2000

Manager
Nacional
 Uruguayan Primera División: 2011–12

River Plate
 Argentine Primera División: 2021
 Copa Argentina: 2015–16, 2016–17, 2018–19
 Supercopa Argentina: 2017, 2019
 Trofeo de Campeones de la Liga Profesional: 2021
 Copa Libertadores: 2015, 2018
 Copa Sudamericana: 2014
 Recopa Sudamericana: 2015, 2016, 2019
 Suruga Bank Championship: 2015

Individual
South American Coach of the Year: 2018, 2019, 2020

Notes

References

External links

 
 
 Statistics at Irish Times
 Argentine Primera statistics at Fútbol XXI 

1976 births
1995 Copa América players
1995 King Fahd Cup players
1997 Copa América players
1998 FIFA World Cup players
2002 FIFA World Cup players
Argentine expatriate footballers
Argentine expatriate sportspeople in France
Argentine expatriate sportspeople in Monaco
Argentine expatriate sportspeople in the United States
Argentine footballers
Argentine football managers
Argentina international footballers
Argentine Primera División players
Argentina youth international footballers
AS Monaco FC players
Association football midfielders
Club Atlético River Plate footballers
Club Atlético River Plate managers
Club Nacional de Football managers
Club Nacional de Football players
Designated Players (MLS)
D.C. United players
Expatriate footballers in France
Expatriate footballers in Monaco
Expatriate footballers in Uruguay
Expatriate soccer players in the United States
Footballers at the 1995 Pan American Games
Footballers at the 1996 Summer Olympics
Ligue 1 players
Living people
Major League Soccer players
Medalists at the 1995 Pan American Games
Medalists at the 1996 Summer Olympics
Olympic footballers of Argentina
Olympic medalists in football
Olympic silver medalists for Argentina
Pan American Games gold medalists for Argentina
Pan American Games medalists in football
Paris Saint-Germain F.C. players
Sportspeople from Buenos Aires Province
Uruguayan Primera División players